Alexandre Lippmann (11 June 1881 – 23 February 1960) was a French Olympic champion épée fencer. He won two Olympic gold medals, as well as three other Olympic medals.

Early and personal life
Lippmann was born in Paris, France, in the 17th arrondissement.
Through his mother, Marie-Alexandrine-Henriette Dumas, he was the grandson of Alexandre Dumas  and great-grandson of French writer Alexandre Dumas, author of The Three Musketeers. His father was Jewish. Lippmann was also a genre painter.

Fencing career
In 1909, he won the French épée championship.

He won five medals, including two gold medals, at three different Olympic Games: a team gold and an individual silver in the 1908 Olympics in London at 26 years of age, a team bronze and individual silver in the 1920 Olympics in Antwerp at 38 years of age, and a team gold in the 1924 Olympics in Paris at the age of 42.

He missed out on the opportunity to fence in two other Olympic Games.  This was because French fencers did not compete at the 1912 Olympic Games in Stockholm because France disagreed with the rules of the competition, and World War I caused the cancellation of what would have been the 1916 Summer Olympics.

Lippmann was inducted into the International Jewish Sports Hall of Fame in 1984.

He died in 1960, in the 8th arrondissement of Paris.

See also

 List of select Jewish fencers

References

External links
 

1881 births
1960 deaths
French male épée fencers
Jewish French sportspeople
Jewish male épée fencers
Olympic fencers of France
Olympic bronze medalists for France
Olympic silver medalists for France
Olympic gold medalists for France
Olympic medalists in fencing
Medalists at the 1908 Summer Olympics
Medalists at the 1920 Summer Olympics
Medalists at the 1924 Summer Olympics
Fencers at the 1908 Summer Olympics
Fencers at the 1920 Summer Olympics
Fencers at the 1924 Summer Olympics
Fencers from Paris
French sportspeople of Haitian descent
Dumas family
20th-century French people